César François Adolphe d'Houdetot (31 August 1799 – 30 July 1869) was a 19th-century French writer, author of numerous books on hunting.

Biography 
The son of general , he joined the administration under Louis-Philippe and became a particular collector in the financial administration of Le Havre. In 1848, he prepared the boarding measures of the King and Queen for a sea cruise, which would be the subject of his book Honfleur et le Havre, huit jours d'une royale infortune (1850).

His books were regularly published until today. The latest edition of his Chasseur rustique, illustrated by Horace Vernet, was published in 2000.

He also contributed to the writing of the comédie-vaudeville Le Coup de pistolet in 1828 with Charles de Livry, presented at Théâtre des Variétés 17 March 1828.

Works 
1828: Le Coup de pistolet, comédie-vaudeville in 1 act, with Charles de Livry
1844: Types militaires français
1844: Le Tir au pistolet, causeries théoriques
1850: Honfleur et le Havre, huit jours d'une royale infortune
1852: Système-Fontenau pour les armes à percussion. Notice historique sur l'origine et les progrès de cette découverte, with Eugène Talbot
1852: Le Chasseur rustique contenant la théorie des armes, du tir et de la chasse au chien d'arrêt, en plaine, au bois, au marais, sur les bancs
1853: Dix épines pour une fleur, petites pensées d'un chasseur à l'affût
1855: La petite vénerie ou La chasse au chien courant, drawings by Horace Vernet
1855: Chasses exceptionnelles, galerie des chasseurs illustres
1857: Le Tir au fusil de chasse, à la carabine et au pistolet, petit traité des armes à l'usage des chasseurs
1858: Braconnage et contre-braconnage
1859: Les Femmes chasseresses
1862: Nouveau porte-amarre
1864: Canon porte-amarres à rayure-fente

Bibliography 
 Louise Élisabeth Vigée-Le Brun, Souvenirs de Madame Vigée Le Brun, vol.2, 1869, 
 Gustave Vapereau, Dictionnaire universel des contemporains, 1870,  
 Camille Dreyfus, André Berthelot, La Grande encyclopédie, 1886, 
 Hippolyte Buffenoir, La Comtesse d'Houdetot: sa famille, ses amis, 1905, 
 Louis Cario, Charles Régismanset, La pensée française: anthologie des auteurs de maximes du XVIe siècle à nos jours, Mercure de France, 1921,

Notes 

19th-century French writers
1799 births
Writers from Le Havre
1869 deaths
Hunting in France